Coryphopterus curasub, the yellow-spotted sand goby, is a species of goby found in the Eastern Central Pacific Ocean.

References

Gobiidae
Fish of the Atlantic Ocean
Fish described in 2015
Taxa named by Carole C. Baldwin
Taxa named by David Ross Robertson